Digital Journalism is a peer-reviewed academic journal that covers the field of journalism. The journal was established in 2013 by Bob Franklin (Cardiff University). The editor-in-chief is Oscar Westlund (Oslo Metropolitan University, Volda University College, and University of Gothenburg). The journal is published by Routledge and is abstracted and indexed in Scopus and the Social Sciences Citation Index. According to the Journal Citation Reports, the journal has a 2021 impact factor of 7.986.

References

External links
 

Routledge academic journals
English-language journals
Publications established in 2013
Journalism journals